

Performers

Awards

Best Song
Alejandro Sanz (featuring Alicia Keys) — "Looking for Paradise"
Maldita Nerea — "Cosas que Suenan a..."
Robert Ramírez — "Sick of Love"
Estopa (featuring Rosario) — "El Run Run"
Pereza — "Lady Madrid"

Best Video
Alejandro Sanz — "Nuestro Amor Será Leyenda"
Dani Martín — "16 Añitos"
Carlos Jean — "Ay Haití"
Miguel Bosé — "Estuve A Punto De"
Maldita Nerea — "El Secreto de Las Tortugas"

Best Album
Miguel Bosé — Cardio
Alejandro Sanz — Paraíso Express
David Bisbal — Sin Mirar Atrás
Estopa — X Anniversarium
El Canto del Loco — Radio La Colifata presenta: El Canto del Loco

Best Solo
Melendi
Alejandro Sanz
El Pescao
Dani Martín
Enrique Iglesias

Group
Despistaos
Dover
Pignoise
Taxi
Maldita Nerea

Best New Act
Maldita Nerea
Pol 3.14
Funambulista
Preciados
Robert Ramírez

Best Tour
David Bisbal — Sin Mirar Atrás Tour
Miguel Bosé — Cardio Tour
Alejandro Sanz — Paraíso Express Tour
Maldita Nerea — El Secreto de Las Tortugas Tour
Pignoise — Año Zero Tour

Best Argentine Act
Miranda!
Teen Angels
Dante
Diego Torres
Emmanuel Horvilleur

Best Chilean Act
Koko
Mendez
Zaturno
Chico Trujillo
Croni K

Best Colombian Act
Dragon & Caballero
J. Balvin
Sebastian Yepes
Santiago Cruz
Don Tetto
Kio Dj

Best Costa Rican Act
Fuerza Dread
Percance
Escats
4/ 24
Alonso Solis

Best Ecuadorian Act
Caalu
Norca
Tercer Mundo
Fausto Miño
Daniel Betancourt

Best Guatemalan Act
Francis Dávila
Malacates Trebol Shop
Duo Sway
El Clubo
Viento en Contra

Best Mexican Act
Alejandro Fernández
Camila
Belanova
Panteon Rococo
Moenia

Best Panamanian Act
Manuel Araúz
Iván Barrios
Margarita Henríquez
Comando Tiburón
Jhonny D

Best Latin Song
Shakira — "Waka Waka (Esto es África)"
Camila — "Mientes"
Diego Torres — "Guapa"
Juanes — "Yerbatero"
Paulina Rubio — "Ni Rosas Ni Juguetes"

Best Latin Act
Shakira
Juanes
Wisin & Yandel
Camila
Pitbull

Best International Song
David Guetta (featuring Akon) — "Sexy Bitch"
Kesha — "Tik Tok"
Lady Gaga — "Bad Romance"
Edward Maya (featuring Vika Jigulina) — "Stereo Love"
Taio Cruz — "Break Your Heart"

Best International Act
David Guetta
Lady Gaga
Kesha
Kylie Minogue
Rihanna

Lifetime Achievement Award
Cher

Presenters
Leonor Watling — presented Best Group
Mar Montoro — introduced Edward Maya (featuring Vika Jigulina)
Ana María Polvorosa and Pepa Rus — presented Best Costa Rican Act and Best International Act
José Motá — presented Best Chilean Act
Félix Gómez and Inma Cuesta — presented Best Tour
Ricky Martin — presented
La Mala Rodríguez — presented Best Colombian Act
Vanesa Sáez — Best Argentine Act
Ana Fernández and Luis Fernández — presented Best International Song
Fdez & Fdez — presented Best Ecuadorian Act
Tony Aguilar — introduced Dani Martín
Melanie Olivares and Vanessa Romero — presented Best Panamanian Act
Miren Ibarguren and Canco Rodríguez — presented Best Latin Song and Best Guatemalan Act
Mar Saura and Arturo Valls — presented Best Mexican Act
Álex Martínez and Úrsula Corberó — presented Best Video
Mario Casas and María Valverde — presented Best New Act
Sara Carbonero and José Ramón de la Morena — presented Best Latin Act and Best Solo
Alicia Sanz and Aleix Espargaró — presented Best Album
Angie Cepeda and Carlos Baute — presented Best Song

2010 music awards
Los Premios 40 Principales
2010 in Spanish music